Apryl A. Alexander (born c. 1983) is an American clinical and forensic psychologist who is an associate professor at the University of Denver. Alexander directs students at the Denver Forensic Institute for Research, Service and Training (Denver FIRST), and engages in clinical psychology practice. She is co-founder of the University of Denver's Prison Arts Initiative where incarcerated individuals engage in a therapeutic, educational arts curricula.

Early life and education 
Alexander was born in Louisiana and was driven to pursue higher education from a young age. In 2001, she pursued her undergraduate education at Virginia Polytechnic Institute, becoming the first woman in her family to pursue a postsecondary education. She started her degree planning to pursue veterinary studies, when her volunteer experiences working with sexual assault and domestic violence survivors changed her path. Alexander switched her major to psychology and minored in sociology and, in 2005, graduated with a Bachelors of Science. She worked as a counsellor at the Women's Resource Center in the New River Valley in Radford, Virginia. As a CARE (Crisis Advocate Responding Effectively) companion, she provided support to adults and children who had faced sexual assault. During this experience she saw patterns in the behavior and stories of the sexual offenders, such that they often had trauma in their own backgrounds. This led Alexander to shift her career towards education strategies for offenders.

Alexander's motivation to pursue a master's degree at Radford University was driven by her experience as a counsellor, but also by the interactions she had with Ann Elliott, a professor of psychology at Radford, while at the Women's Resource Center. While at Radford, she was active in community engagement and education of alcohol awareness, internet safety, and sexual assault. She worked in the Office of Substance Abuse and Sexual Assault Education and conducted exit interviews for the Radford Aware Program for students that violated alcohol policies.

Alexander pursued her graduate degree in clinical psychology at the Florida Institute of Technology. She studied there because of The Family Learning Program which supports individuals and their family members affected by sexual abuse. Alexander concentrated in Forensic Psychology and also studied child and family therapy for sufferers of maltreatment and trauma. She obtained a master's degree in 2009, and completed her PsyD by 2012. Alexander worked in a variety of settings where she interfaced with offenders as well as victims to elucidate evidence-based approaches to addressing violence.

Career and research 
Alexander was recruited to Auburn University in Auburn, Alabama in 2013, where she became an assistant clinical professor within the department of psychology. Alexander got involved in the treatment program offered in collaboration between Auburn and the Department of Youth Services to provide education and normative experiences to adolescents who had sexually offended.

In 2016, Alexander was recruited to the University of Denver where she became a clinical assistant professor in the Graduate School for Professional Psychology as well as the director of Denver FIRST (Forensic Institute for Research, Service, and Training), an Outpatient Competency Restoration Program. In 2017, Alexander founded the Prison Arts Initiative. As the co-director, from 2017 to 2019, Alexander helped design and implement therapeutic creative programming for incarcerated individuals in Colorado State Prisons. As of 2019, Alexander was appointed faculty affiliate of the Scrivner Institute of Public Policy, and in 2020 she was promoted to tenured associate professor of the Graduate School of Professional Psychology.

Trauma and psychological illness 
Alexander's early research explored how accumulation of trauma over a lifetime impacts psychological stress scores in victims. Polyvictimization, or high accumulation levels of victimization, accounted for most of the variability in psychological distress among college females and importantly, accounted for significantly more variability than any individual category of victimization on psychological stress. Her findings highlight the severe impact of polyvictimization on mental health and the importance of healthcare professionals looking at cumulative victimizations in the history of their patients as opposed to focusing on single instances when providing diagnoses and care.

Alexander was interested in looking at the rates of post-traumatic stress disorder in individuals diagnosed with severe mental illness to assess this correlation. She found that true rates of PTSD might be underrepresented due to the primary concern being severe mental illness in individuals where trauma might have been the precursor to the mental illness. Her findings suggest the importance of probing the prior traumatic experiences of mentally ill in order to target treatment towards more trauma-centered approaches if necessary.

Importance of sex education in preventing sexual assault 
In 2018, Alexander gave a TEDx talk in Denver where she discussed her research on the importance of sex education in preventing sexual assault in teens. She talked about her research exploring the backgrounds and statistics of childhood sex offenders, recounting that one third of sexual offences are committed by individuals under the age of 18. She further explored what was considered as a sex offence in the record of these young adults, and the majority of them were not what one typical thinks of as sexual offences. Unfortunately, the label of sex offender remains permanent in the lives of these children as they move into adulthood, even though less than 4% of these individuals never go on to commit another offence. During her time in Alabama, Alexander found that the majority of adolescents who committed sexual offences were not educated about consent until after they committed sexual offences. However, once given the education on why their actions were considered offences, they learned and they understood, which made Alexander adamant about ensuring that all students are given the chance to be educated on consent in school, prior to high school, to prevent children's lives from being ruined by their labels. After her talk, Alexander continued on a path towards making her research and advocacy into policy changes. She provided legislative testimony for a bill that would mandate consent education as a component of the sexual education courses in schools, and this bill was passed and made into a law in 2019.

Community engagement and advocacy during the COVID-19 crisis 
Alexander has been involved in science communication and advocacy work during the COVID-19 pandemic. She was featured in Denver's ABC News discussing how the variability of responses and actions taken from state-to-state increased uncertainty and fear in the population. Alexander was featured on Denver ABC News to discuss her ideas about shifting the language of the COVID-19 pandemic from “social distancing” to “physical distancing” as a means to reduce isolation and improve mental health. She emphasized maintaining physical distance but staying socially connected in as many ways as possible.

Alexander has been communicating with her community regarding the difference in treatment that certain groups have been receiving throughout the pandemic. She has been particularly concerned with how institutional marginalization has led to exacerbated marginalization during COVID, especially with the homeless, low wage, and racial/ethnic minority populations. She emphasizes documenting as rigorously as possible who is getting tested, treated, dying, and recovering every step of the way to track these disparities and begin to address them as effectively as possible. Alexander and a team of researchers and advocates published an article on the topic in a Research-to-Policy Collaboration.

Awards and honors 
2020 Emerging Scholar by Diverse: Issues in Higher Education
2019 Michele Alexander Early Career Award for Scholarship and Service from the Society for the Psychological Study of Social Issues
2019 Early Career Award for Outstanding Contributions to Benefit Children, Youth, and Families, American Psychological Association (APA) Committee on Children, Youth, and Families
2017 Karen Saywitz Early Career Award for Outstanding Contributions to Research, American Psychological Association (APA) Division 37 Section on Child Maltreatment
2017 APA Early Career Achievement Award, American Psychological Association (APA) Committee on Early Career Psychologists
2016 Outstanding Recent Alumna, Virginia Tech Influential Black Alumni Awards, Virginia Tech Alumni Association
2011 The Elizabeth B. Wolf Outstanding Clinical Student Award, Florida Tech School of Psychology

Select publications 
 Falligant, J. M., Fix, R. L., & Alexander, A. A. (2020). Simulated verdicts for adolescents with illegal sexual behavior: The impact of medical data and race/ethnicity. Behavioral Sciences & the Law, 38(1), 51–65. doi: 10.1002/bsl.2431
 Alexander, A. A. (2019). Confluence model of sexual aggression in college males: Examining polyvictimization. Violence and Gender, 6(2), 139–141. doi: 10.1089/vio.2018.0025
 Morais+, H. B., Alexander, A. A., Fix+, R. L., & Burkhart, B. R. (2018). Childhood sexual abuse in adolescents adjudicated for sex offenses: Mental health consequences and sexual offending behaviors. Sexual Abuse, 30(1), 23–42. doi: 10.1177/1079063215625224
 Fix, R. L., Alexander, A. A., & Burkhart, B. R. (2018). From family violence exposure to violent offending: Examining effects of race and mental health in a moderated mediation model among confined male juveniles. International Journal of Offender Therapy and Comparative Criminology, 62(9), 2567–2585. doi: 10.1177/0306624X17731101
 Falligant, J. M., Fix, R. L., & Alexander, A. A. (2017). Judicial decision-making and juvenile offenders: Effects of medical evidence and victim age. Journal of Child Sexual Abuse, 26(4), 388- 406. doi: 10.1080/10538712.2017.1296914
 Morais, H. B., Joyal, C. C., Alexander, A. A., Fix, R. L., & Burkhart, B. R. (2016). The neuropsychology of adolescent sexual offending: Testing an executive dysfunction hypothesis. Sexual Abuse: A Journal of Research and Treatment, 28(8), 741–754. doi: 10.1177/1079063215569545
 Alexander, A. A., Welsh, E., & Glassmire, D. (2016). Underdiagnosing PTSD in a state hospital. Journal of Forensic Psychology Practice, 16(5), 449–460. doi: 10.1080/15228932.2016.1234142
 Richmond, J. M., Elliott, A. N., Pierce, T. W., Aspelmeier, J. E., & Alexander, A. A. (2009). Polyvictimization, childhood victimization, and psychological distress in college women. Child Maltreatment, 14(2), 127–147. doi: 10.1177/1077559508326357

References 

American forensic scientists
Women forensic scientists
Forensic psychologists
1983 births
Scientists from Louisiana
University of Denver faculty
Virginia Tech alumni
Radford University alumni
Florida Institute of Technology alumni
Living people